Pirići may refer to:

 Pirići (Bratunac), a village in Bosnia and Herzegovina
 Pirići (Bugojno), a village in Bosnia and Herzegovina
 Pirići, Vitez, a village in Bosnia and Herzegovina